St Stephens, Cornwall or St Stephen, Cornwall may refer to:

 St Stephen-in-Brannel, a village near St Austell, Cornwall.
 St Stephen-by-Launceston, near Launceston.
 St Stephens by Saltash, near Saltash.